Flavio Pelliccioni (born 18 March 1956) is a Sammarinese windsurfer. He competed in the Windglider event at the 1984 Summer Olympics.

References

External links
 
 

1956 births
Living people
Sammarinese windsurfers
Sammarinese male sailors (sport)
Olympic sailors of San Marino
Sailors at the 1984 Summer Olympics – Windglider
Sportspeople from the Province of Rimini